Bankstown District Cricket Club is a cricket club based in Bankstown, Sydney, Australia. Founded in 1951, the Bulldogs joined the Sydney Grade Cricket Competition in 1952.

The club's home ground is Bankstown Oval, and it has won 7 first grade premierships.

The club's most famous players include all four Waugh brothers (Steve, Mark, Dean and Danny), Jeff Thomson, Len Pascoe, Trevor Chappell, Corey Richards, Mark Stoneman and Aaron Bird.

See also

References

External links
 

Sydney Grade Cricket clubs
Cricket clubs established in 1951
1951 establishments in Australia
Bankstown, New South Wales